UN (also known as United N-generation) was a Korean musical group from South Korea under NH Media (then NH Planning). It consisted of two members: Choi Jung-won and Kim Jeong-hoon. They released 5 albums from 2000 to 2005. "For a Lifetime", a single from their first album, was their first significant hit.

Information 
In 1999, the two members, who are both from the top universities in Korea, formed UN but it wasn't until June 2000 that they released their first album.

In September 2005, 5 years after their debut and 5 albums later, their management agency, Laful Entertainment, announced that the duo would disband after the expiration of their contract.

Discography

Album

Single
  (2004-07-01)

DVD
 Special Album Music Video (2003-04-17)
 Sweet & Strong (2005-07-21)

Awards

References

External links
 Profile at KBS World 
 Discography at AznSource 
 Profile & Discography at Baidu 

K-pop music groups
Musical groups disestablished in 2005
Musical groups established in 2000
South Korean boy bands
South Korean musical duos